Georg Ludwig Scharfenberg ( 28 December 1746 , Hümpfershausen - 2 December 1810,Ritschenhausen ) was a German entomologist and a Lutheran pastor.
He was the son of a teacher and was educated at the University of Halle. Scharfenberg published notes on insects in Journal für Liebhaber der Entomologie edited by Ludwig Gottlieb Scriba. He described Paraswammerdamia albicapitella, Operophtera fagata
and Bucculatrix bechsteinella(with Bechstein).

Works
with Johann Matthäus Bechstein Vollständige Naturgeschichte der schädlichen Forstinsekten. Ein Handbuch für Forstmänner, Cameralisten und Oekonomen, Leipzig 1804

References
Ratzeburg, J. T. C. 1874: Forstwissenschaftliches Schriftsteller-Lexikon. Berlin, Nicolai'sche Buchhandlung, X+1-516 S
Gaedike, R.; Groll, E. K. & Taeger, A. 2012: Index Novus Litteraturae Entomologicae : Bibliography of the entomological literature from the beginning until 1863 :  online database - version 1.0 - Senckenberg Deutsches Entomologisches Institut. 

German lepidopterists
1810 deaths
1746 births